Kožichovice is a municipality and village in Třebíč District in the Vysočina Region of the Czech Republic. It has about 400 inhabitants.

Notable people
Mathias Zdarsky (1856–1940), pioneer of alpine skiing

References

Villages in Třebíč District